Jan-Niklas Beste (born 4 January 1999) is a German professional footballer who plays as a left-back for  club 1. FC Heidenheim.

Club career
After joining Borussia Dortmund at the age of eight, he made his competitive debut for the senior squad on 12 August 2017 in a 2017–18 DFB-Pokal match-up against Rielasingen-Arlen. Despite appearing for the senior squad in pre-season friendlies that summer as well, he spent the rest of the 2017–18 season on the Under-19 squad.

On 4 July 2018, he moved to Werder Bremen, where he also was assigned to the reserves squad for the first season with them.

On 18 June 2019, he was loaned to FC Emmen in the Netherlands for the 2019–20 season.  He made his Eredivisie debut for Emmen on 24 August 2019 in a game against Willem II.

In July 2020, Beste again left Werder Bremen for a loan spell, joining SSV Jahn Regensburg for two seasons.

On 15 June 2022, Beste signed a three-year contract with 1. FC Heidenheim.

References

External links
 

1999 births
Sportspeople from Hamm
Living people
German footballers
Footballers from North Rhine-Westphalia
Association football fullbacks
Germany youth international footballers
Borussia Dortmund players
SV Werder Bremen players
SV Werder Bremen II players
FC Emmen players
SSV Jahn Regensburg players
1. FC Heidenheim players
2. Bundesliga players
Regionalliga players
Eredivisie players
German expatriate footballers
German expatriate sportspeople in the Netherlands
Expatriate footballers in the Netherlands